Endless Procession of Souls is the tenth studio album by Swedish death metal band Grave. It was released on August 27, 2012 through Century Media Records.

Track listing

Personnel
Grave
 Ola Lindgren - guitars, vocals
 Ronnie Bergerståhl - drums
 Tobias Cristiansson - bass
 Mika Lagrén - guitars

Production
 Ola Lindgren - engineering, mixing, mastering, producer
 Costin Chioreanu - cover art
 Therese Larsson - photography
 Carsten Drescher - layout

References

2012 albums
Grave (band) albums
Century Media Records albums